Agustin "Tino" Nuñez (born August 22, 1984) is an American soccer player who most recently played for Ontario Fury in the Major Arena Soccer League.

Playing career

Youth and college 
Nuñez was a four-year letter-winner at Millikan High School in Long Beach, California.  With Nuñez on the squad, Millikan ran to four consecutive Moore League Championships as well as one CIF Championship in Nuñez's junior year.  Personally, Nuñez claimed numerous awards, including Freshman of the Year in his first year and First Team All-Moore League, All-CIF, and league offensive player of the year in his last.  As a senior, Nuñez scored a team high 25 goals and 18 assists.

After high school, Nuñez moved on to Compton Community College's soccer team.  With the Tartars for only the 2003 season, he earned team MVP honors with 15 goals.

After the 2003 season, Nuñez transferred to the University of California, Santa Barbara.  In 2004, his first season with the Gauchos, Nuñez played in 23 games (starting 6), scoring 2 goals and adding 6 assists.  In addition to Nuñez, the UCSB's 2004 team also featured several other now-professional players including Tyler Rosenlund, Andy Iro, Bryan Byrne, and Ivan Becerra, and the Gauchos marched all the way to the 2004 Division I Men's College Cup, losing on penalties to Indiana University.

Nuñez had to redshirt the 2005 season to rehabilitate a torn ACL, but made a strong return the following season.  In 2006, Nuñez played in 19 games (starting 7), scoring 1 goal, as the Gauchos were crowned champions of Division I college soccer by beating the Bruins from the University of California, Los Angeles in the 2006 Division I Men's College Cup in St. Louis, Missouri.  This marked UCSB's first ever national championship in soccer and only second overall.

In 2007, Nuñez played in 21 games (all starts), scoring 5 goals and adding 5 assists for the Gauchos.

Professional 
Nuñez was drafted by Real Salt Lake in the 2nd Round (17th Overall) of the 2008 MLS Supplemental Draft.

His first action with the RSL first team came in the Lamar Hunt U.S. Open Cup against the San Jose Earthquakes on April 30, 2008.  He came in as a 75th-minute substitute and assisted on the final goal of the game scored by Andy Williams.

Nuñez's first Major League Soccer appearance came on May 31, 2008, again against the San Jose Earthquakes.  This time he was an 85th-minute substitute.  His first MLS goal was a game-winner which came on 21 June 2008 against New England Revolution in the 60th minute. Nuñez finished his rookie season with 9 league appearances (2 starts) and 1 goal. He also scored 5 goals in Reserve League play.

The following season, Nuñez found playing time more difficult to come by, making just three appearances during RSL's 2009 MLS Cup-winning campaign. Real Salt Lake waived Nuñez in March 2010.

In April 2010, Nuñez signed with USSF D-2 Pro League club Rochester Rhinos for the 2010 season. He played with the Rhinos for one season.

NSC Minnesota Stars of the North American Soccer League signed Nuñez on March 22, 2011. He was released by the club on November 29, 2011.

Tino spent the 2012-13 Winter season with the Baltimore Blast of the MISL.

In October 2013, Tino signed with the Ontario Fury of the Professional Arena Soccer League. In his first year, Nunez appeared in 11 games and scored 22 goals with 6 assists. In his second year, Nunez appeared in 12 games and scored 12 goals with 15 assists. In his third year, Nunez appeared in 14 games and scored 12 goals with 8 assists. In his fourth year, Nunez appeared in 14 games and scored 9 goals with 5 assists.

Coaching career 
Nunez returned to his high school alma mater in 2010 and is head coach of Millikan's girls soccer team. Under his guidance, the Rams have transformed from an also-ran to a winning program, with back-to-back Moore League titles in the 2018–19 and 2019–2020 seasons. Previously, Millikan Girls Soccer had not won the Moore League since 1991 nor successive titles since 1984-85 and 1985-86. When he took over the reins in 2013, he told the Long Beach Press-Telegram: “I don't want us to just compete anymore. I feel Millikan can compete. Now it's about winning... I feel we have a chance of taking [the Moore League Title]. That's what we want the girls to believe."

Honors

Real Salt Lake 
Major League Soccer MLS Cup (1): 2009
Major League Soccer Eastern Conference Championship (1): 2009

Rochester Rhinos 
USSF Division 2 Pro League Regular Season Champions (1): 2010

UC Santa Barbara 
NCAA Men's Division I Soccer Championship (1): 2006

References

External links 
 Ontario Fury player profile
 PASL player profile
 
 MISL player profile
 
 
 
 
 Harrisburg City player profile
 
 
 Bakersfield Brigade player profile 
 UC Santa Barbara player profile

1984 births
Living people
Soccer players from Long Beach, California
American soccer players
Association football forwards
UC Santa Barbara Gauchos men's soccer players
Bakersfield Brigade players
Real Salt Lake players
Penn FC players
Rochester New York FC players
Minnesota United FC (2010–2016) players
Pittsburgh Riverhounds SC players
Baltimore Blast (2008–2014 MISL) players
USL League Two players
Major League Soccer players
USL Second Division players
USSF Division 2 Professional League players
North American Soccer League players
USL Championship players
Major Indoor Soccer League (2008–2014) players
Real Salt Lake draft picks
American beach soccer players
Ontario Fury players
Major Arena Soccer League players
High school soccer coaches in the United States